Sultana Meher (Fatima Hashim Daulah, b. 6 April 1938) is a memoir writer (Tazkara Nigaar). She is a poet, short story writer, novelist and journalist.

Early life
Sultana Meher was born in Mumbai, India on 6 April 1938. She is the eldest daughter of Muhammad Hashim Daulah and Khadeja Hashim. Her father died when she was 13, forcing her to stop her education. She was fond of books and started writing stories in newspapers. She married poet and journalist Saeed Raza Saeed. After the birth of her first son Sohail Saeed she moved to Pakistan along with her family.

After the birth of her two children Sultana Meher decided to complete her education. She started high school and afterwards attended Karachi University, where she earned her Masters in Journalism in 1971. She studied while working as a journalist and looking after her family. Sultana Meher went to the US in 1991 to join her sons. There she continued her literary activities. The Urdu Writer Society of North America recognized her efforts in Urdu literature. Meher met Jawed Akhtar Choudhry and remarried in September 2002. She lives in Birmingham, United Kingdom.

Career
Meher started her career with The Daily Hindustan, Bombay, then became an editor of the Ladies section in the newspaper The Daily ANJAAM, Karachi, Pakistan. She joined Daily JANG, Karachi and worked there from 1967 to 1979 as a Journalist. She published her own Monthly Magazine ‘The Roop, from 1980 to 1991.

Publications
Sultana Meher has written more than 20 books and hundreds of articles.

Novels 
Dagh e Dil 1962
Tajwar 1966
Ik Kiran Ujalay Ki 1969
Jab Basant Rut Aai 1972

Story collections 
Band Seepian 1967
Dhoop aur Saiban 1980
Dil Ki Abrooraezi

Poetry 
 Harf e Mohtaber ( Majmooa e Kalam) 1996

Criticism, compilations and anthologies 
Aaj Ki Shairaat 1974
Iqbal Daure Jadeed Ki Awaaz 1977
Sahir Ka Fun aur Shakhsiat 1989
Sukhanwar  (Tazkara e Shura e Pakistan)1979
Sukhanwar Vol 1: 1978,1989 & 2000
Sukhanwar Vol 2: 1996
Sukhanwar Vol 3: 1998
Sukhanwar Vol 4: 2000
Sukhanwar Vol5: 2004
Guftanee Vol 1:( Nasar NgarooN ka Tazkara) 2000
Guftanee Vol 2: (Nasar NagarooN ka Tazkara) 2004

References 

1938 births
Living people
Muhajir people
Pakistani poets
University of Karachi alumni
Urdu-language poets from Pakistan
Writers from Karachi